Rinku Hooda is a 17 year old Indian para javelin thrower who competes in the F-46 category. He a member of the Indian team at the 2016 Summer Paralympic Games in Rio de Janeiro. He is currently being supported by the GoSports Foundation through the Para Champions Programme.

Early life and background 
Originally from a small village on the outskirts of Dhamar, Rohtak, Haryana, Rinku was introduced to the sport of Javelin by fellow Indian para athlete Amit Kumar Saroha. As a young boy, he had lost his left arm in an accident involving a fan blade.

Career
Rinku competed in Rio in the same category as fellow Indian Para athlete and 2004 Paralympic Games Gold medallist Devendra Jhajharia. He came fifth, securing a new personal best of 54.39m.

Achievements 
Paralympics

World Championships

References

Athletes (track and field) at the 2016 Summer Paralympics
Indian male javelin throwers
Living people
Paralympic athletes of India
People from Rohtak
Athletes from Haryana
Year of birth missing (living people)